Otoconin is a structural glycoprotein found in the otoconial membrane of vertebrates. It is the major protein component of the otoconia (ear dust).

In mice the protein is called otoconin-90, and is coded by the Ocn-95 gene. In humans the ortholog is called PLA2L, originally believed to be a pseudogene.

In mice the protein contains 469 amino acids, and is coded by 1906 base-pair DNA. In mice the protein is first formed at day 9.5 in the otic vesicle dorsal wall epithelium, and also in the endolymphatic duct. This is before any minerals are deposited. Four days later it also appears in the non-sensory epithelium of the utricle and saccule and semicircular canals. The roof of the cochlear duct also has some. By ten days after birth the protein is not found in any cells, but only in the acellular membranes.

The otoconin-90 contains two secretory phospholipase A2 (sPLA2) domains. sPLA2 has a rigid structure with eight disulfide bonds. The sPLA2 domain has the ability to bind a phospholipid, but does not have enzymatic capability. Presumably the domain also binds calcium Ca2+ ions and carbonate CO32+. Otoconin-90 would position the ions to fit into a calcite lattice. The calcium is hypothesized to be secreted from the sensory epithelium into the gelatinous substance on the top of which it meets otoconin and forms otoconia.

In amphibians (Xenopus) a similar mass protein is contained in the utricle along with calcite. The saccule contains aragonite with otoconin-22 which is 22 kDa in mass. Otoconin-22 contains 127 amino acids. Otoconin-22 has a single sPLA2 domain.

Chondrostean fish contain a similar protein of 40 to 50 kDa mass, and vaterite as the mineral component.

In mammals otoconin makes up 90% of the protein component of an otoconium grain, primarily in the core.

References

Glycoproteins